Żabie Doły is a nature and landscape protected area in Silesia, Poland.  The Żabie Doły complex is located entirely within the Silesian Metropolis and encompasses land heavily altered by human activity. The protected area covers 2.262 km² . At Żabie Doły, 129 species of birds have been identified, including 70 nesting species and 17 species rare in the region. Other fauna and flora is also well represented.

The name ""Żabie Doły" can be roughly translated as "Frog Ditches".

Location and history 
The Żabie Doły conservation area is located entirely within the limits of the cities of Bytom, Chorzów and Piekary Slaskie in the center of the highly urbanized region of Upper Silesia.

Many centuries of human activity, in particular underground mining and metal smelting, left the area covered with unused water retention pools, post-mining sinkholes, tailings and slag heaps. The local mining included zinc, lead, and hard coal. The majority of the land transformation by the humans occurred in the 1950s. The discovery of its current biological richness was a surprise.

The area received the legally-protected status in 1997, partially due to the interest of high-school students (from high schools in Bytom and Louisenlund, Germany).

Legal status 
The Żabie Doły area has currently a status of the "nature and landscape complex" within the legal framework of the protected areas of Poland. Currently, efforts are under way to further upgrade the status to that of a nature reserve.

Sources 

Protected areas of Poland
Silesian Voivodeship